Gerhard Gruber (born 6 May 1951 in Aigen im Mühlkreis) is an Austrian composer and piano player. As accompanist for silent films, he has become the leading authority in Austria since 1988.

He has performed for about 600 different films (Istanbul 2018, Paris, Krasnoyarsk /Siberia, Mexico, Kiew, Odessa 2017, Los Angeles 2012, Mumbai-Pune 2012, Washington-Los Angeles 2011, Delhi-Pune-Goa/India 2011, Tokyo 2006/2007/2008, Hobart/Australia 2007–09, Rotorua/New Zealand 2008/2010, Padova, Motovun Film Festival 2007, Cineconcerts Bordeaux 2005, Filmfestival Pisek/CZ 2008/2011, Filmfestival Uherske Hradiste 2009/2011, Viennale 1999-2004/2012, Munich, Hamburg, Diagonale).
He composed the music for Café Elektric.

From 1983 until 2011 Gerhard Gruber was working and performing as a composer and musician for theatre.

He was featured in Ilse Aichinger's Subtexte as "the one who first makes each film possible and, at the same time, unnecessary. Those who have seen his hands move on the illuminated keys might even risk forgetting Chaplin"

Awards
Gruber was awarded the Nestroy Theatre Prize in 2006 and the Bühnenkunstpreis des Landes Oberösterreich in 2008.

Performances for silent movies (out of 600)
 Broken Blossoms
 Das Cabinet des Dr. Caligari
 Die freudlose Gasse
 Die Sklavenkönigin
 The White Hell of Pitz Palu
 Café Elektric
 Intolerance
 Metropolis
 Nanook of the North
 Nosferatu, eine Symphonie des Grauens
 Pandora's Box

Venues 
 Toronto York University 2019
 Luxembourg 2019
 Beijing International Film Festival 2019
 Bratislava 2019
 Istanbul 2018
 Beijing, Shanghai 2017
 Krasnoyarsk Siberia 2017
 Bratislava 2017
 Paris, Fondation Jérôme Seydoux-Pathé 2017
 Silent Film Festival Hobart 2017
 Ukraine Tour – Kiev, Odessa, Kharkiv 2016
 Mexico City, Querétaro 2016
 Filmoteca Valencia 2016
 Boston Jewish Film Festival 2016

 3rd Students Film Festival of India, Pune 2015
 National Film Center Tokyo 2014
 Auckland University of Technology 2013
 State Cinema Hobart 100th anniversary 2013
 Lenin (nuclear icebreaker) – Film music recordings 2013
 Los Angeles Jewish Film Festival 2012
 Los Angeles American Cinematheque/ Aero Theatre 2012
 Pune-Mumbai/ 2nd India Silent Movie Tour 2012
 Washington-Los Angeles/ USA Silent Movie Tour 2011
 Delhi-Pune-Goa/ India Silent Movie Tour 2011
 Silence! Silent Movie Festival Rotorua, Neuseeland 2008
 Motovun Film Festival 2007
 Jüdisches Filmfestival Wien 2007/2010
 Austria Japan Silent Film Duo Project, Tokyo
 State Cinema Hobart/ Australien 2007/2008/2010
 International Student Film Festival Písek 2008/2011
 Filmfestival Uherske Hradiste/CZ 2009/2011
 Silent Movie at Amici della musica di Padova 2008
 Cinéconcerts Bordeaux 2005
 Breitenseer Lichtspiele Wien
 Viennale
 Metrokino / Filmarchiv Austria
 Österreichisches Filmmuseum
 Munich Film Archive
 Diagonale
 Prater Filmfestival 2005/2006

Theatre works (selection) 

 Das Nibelungenlied – Justus Neumann – 2010
 Die 39 Stufen – Schauspielhaus Salzburg – 2010/2011
 Hennir – Isabel Karajan – 2009
 Bettleroper – Projekttheater Vorarlberg – 2009
 How much, Schatzi? – Projekttheater Vorarlberg – 2006
 Automatenbüfett – Theater in der Josefstadt Wien – 2004
 Der Alpenkönig und der Menschenfeind – Theater in der Josefstadt Wien – 2004
 Mann, Frau, Kind – Theater in der Josefstadt Wien – 2003
 Das Dschungelbuch – Theater der Jugend Wien – 2002
 Der Zerrissene – Volkstheater Wien – 1997
 Die letzten Tage der Menschheit – Donaufestival Krems – 1994
 Mir soll ins Herz gestochen werden – Theater Narrnkastl Wien – 1985
 Mozarella – Zwischen den Zeilen Theater Zürich – 1983

References

External links 
 Official website

Living people
1951 births
Austrian male composers
Austrian composers
Composers for piano